Granuaile's Castle is a tower house and National Monument located in Clare Island, Ireland.

Location

Granuaile's Castle is located on the east coast of Clare Island.

History

Granuaile's Castle was built in the 16th century by the Ó Máille (O'Malley), Kings of Umaill. It was a stronghold of Gráinne Ní Mháille (Grace O'Malley, c. 1530 – c. 1603), the famous "pirate queen." Her other strongholds were at Rockfleet Castle (on Clew Bay) and Carrickkildavnet Castle.

In the 1820s the castle was converted into a police barracks, when the purple slate flashing was added to the two bartizans.

Building

The main living room was at that first floor level with access to the bartizans and the garderobe.

References

National Monuments in County Mayo
Castles in County Mayo